Mikhail Vyacheslavovich Anisin (born March 1, 1988) is a Russian professional ice hockey forward who is currently playing with SC Csíkszereda in the Erste Liga.

Playing career
On 20 October 2013, Anisin was acquired by HC Donbass from HC Neftekhimik Nizhnekamsk for a 4th round selection in the 2014 KHL draft.

In November 2013, Anisin got into a drunken brawl with teammate Serhiy Varlamov while in Ufa, the day prior to a game against Salavat Yulaev. Following an altercation at a nightclub, Anisin fought with Varlamov, bouncers, and later doctors at a hospital where he was being treated. He received two black eyes and a concussion. After 6 games in HC Donbass during the 2013–14 season, the team terminated Anisin's contract for disciplinary reasons related to the fight.

On 7 August 2014, Anisin marked his return to the KHL in signing a try-out contract with expansion club, HC Sochi. On 27 August 2014, he was formally signed to a one-year deal for the ensuing 2014–15 season.

Personal life
He is the son of Vyacheslav Anisin and the brother of Marina Anissina. Anisin is of Ukrainian descent on his mother's side; he remarked in an interview that his ancestors were Don Cossacks.

Career statistics

References

External links

1988 births
Living people
HC CSKA Moscow players
HC Donbass players
HC Dynamo Moscow players
Ice hockey people from Moscow
Metallurg Novokuznetsk players
HC Neftekhimik Nizhnekamsk players
Russian people of Ukrainian descent
Severstal Cherepovets players
HC Sibir Novosibirsk players
HC Sochi players
HC Yugra players
HC Vityaz players
Russian ice hockey forwards